Kowdiar is one of the main localities in the city of Trivandrum, Kerala, India. It is one of the most expensive and cleanest localities in Trivandrum. It is the starting point of the Rajapatha (Royal Path) that stretches to the East Fort. It lies between the localities of Vellayambalam and Peroorkada- a suburb in the vicinity.

Kowdiar is famous for the Kowdiar Palace. It is generally considered one of the most upmarket residential areas within the city and of late has seen numerous apartment complexes being built. The road to Vellayambalam is wide and beautifully maintained and it is one of the good stretches of straight road in the whole Kerala within city limits.

The arterial roads from the Kowdiar Main Road are: 
 Thenmala Road to Peroorkada Junction via Ambalamukku
 Pattom Road to Pattom Junction via Kuravankonam
 PMG TTC Road

The area has a newly renovated park in front of the palace premises with a statue dedicated to Swami Vivekananda.

Landmarks
 Kowdiar Palace
 Raj Bhavan
 Christ Nagar School, Thiruvananthapuram
 Nirmala Bhavan Higher Secondary School

Nearest transportation hubs
 Trivandrum Central Railway Station 6 km
 Trivandrum International Airport  13 km

Suburbs of Thiruvananthapuram